This page details Scotland national football team records and statistics; the most capped players, the players with the most goals, and Scotland's match record by opponent and decade.

Player records

Most capped players

Players in bold are still active with Scotland.

Top goalscorers

Players in bold are still active with Scotland.

Hat-tricks

Table
Wartime internationals, not regarded as official matches, are not included in the list.

Team records

Head to head records

Statistics include official FIFA recognised matches, five matches from a 1967 overseas tour that were reclassified as full internationals in 2021, and a match against a Hong Kong League XI played on 23 May 2002 that the Scottish Football Association includes in its statistical totals.

By period

Statistics include official FIFA recognised matches, five matches from a 1967 overseas tour that were reclassified as full internationals in 2021, and a match against a Hong Kong League XI played on 23 May 2002 that the Scottish Football Association includes in its statistical totals.

Notes

References

 
National association football team records and statistics